The Scout Association is the largest Scouting organisation in the United Kingdom and is the World Organization of the Scout Movement's recognised member for the United Kingdom. Following the origin of Scouting in 1907, the association was formed in 1910 and incorporated in 1912 by a royal charter under its previous name of The Boy Scouts Association.

The association is the largest national Scout organisation in Europe, representing 35% of the membership of the European Scout Region.

, the association claims to provide activities to 464,700 young people (aged 6–25) in the UK with over 116,400 adult volunteers which is more than one adult for each 4 young people. Its programmes include Squirrel Scouts (aged 4–6), Beaver Scouts (aged 6–8), Cub Scouts (aged 8–), Scouts (aged –14), Explorer Scouts (aged 14–18) and adult Network members (aged 18–25).

The association aims to provide "fun, adventure and skills for life and give young people the opportunity to enjoy new adventures, experience outdoors and take part in a range of creative, community and international activities, interact with others, make new friends, gain confidence and have the opportunity to reach their full potential". The organisation and its activities are regulated through its "Policy, Organisation and Rules" (POR).

The association is led by its Chief Scout, the television presenter, adventurer and author Bear Grylls, alongside a UK chief commissioner, Carl Hankinson, and chief executive, Matt Hyde. The association's joint presidents are the Duke of Kent and Princess of Wales, and its patron was the late Queen Elizabeth II.

Open to all

Gender
From 1912 to 1967 the association's name was The Boy Scouts Association and until 1976 only boys were admitted to its programmes. In 1976, girls were allowed to join the Venture Scouts section for 16- to 20-year-olds. This expanded to all the association's programme sections in 1991, although the admission of girls was optional and has only been compulsory since 2007. , Girls make up 27% of all-age participants with a total of 99,989 female participants aged between 6 and 25 and a further 69,460 women involved in volunteer roles (being more than 1 adult female for every 2 female young people), while new recruits are now 71% girls (approx. 2.5 girls for every boy). The Scout Association's activities and leadership positions are open to lesbian, gay, bisexual, transgender and other (LGBT+) young people and adults.

Faith
The association is open to all faiths, and none, with variations to the Scout Promise available to accommodate to those of different religious obligations or national beliefs. Following criticisms of the lack of provision for atheists, in 2012 the association consulted members about the possibility of creating an additional alternative Promise for those without a religion, and in October 2013, announced that an alternative version of the promise would be available from January 2014 for those without a pronounced faith.

Disability
Baden-Powell was keen to allow young people with disabilities to take part in Scouting programmes, and the Disabled Scout Branch (later known as Extension Scouting) was formed in 1926. After the Second World War, specialist Agoonoree Scout camps were run to cater for those unable to camp with their own Scout Groups. Latterly, emphasis has been placed on integrating young people with disabilities into mainstream Groups. Flexibility is built-in to badges and awards for those with special needs and many Scout Counties and Areas have a specialist commissioner or adviser to support inclusion.

History

Formation
 For the origins of Boy Scouts and the Scout Movement before the formation of The Scout Association see Scouting.

The Boy Scouts Association was formed in 1910, in order to provide a national body in the United Kingdom which could organise and support the rapidly growing number of Scout patrols and troops, which had begun to form spontaneously following the publication of Scouting for Boys and The Scout magazine in 1908. It was also the wish of Baden-Powell to separate control of the Scout Movement from his book's publisher as it was felt it was not given the status it deserved as the publisher C. Arthur Pearson controlled much of Scouting.

1910 to 1920: growth

The association grew and spread to much of the British Empire. In 1910, the association approved special uniforms for Sea Scouts and officially adopted use of the name in 1912. On 4 January 1912, the association was incorporated throughout the British Empire by Royal charter for "the purpose of instructing boys of all classes in the principles of discipline loyalty and good citizenship".

Originally, the association's programs were for boys aged between 11 and 18. However, many girls and younger boys wanted to join in. In 1910, a separate organisation, the Girl Guides were created by Baden-Powell and his sister, Agnes, to provide a more "proper" programme of activities. In 1916, the association launched its Wolf Cubs, for boys aged 8 to 11. In 1918, the association launched its Rover Scouts for those over 18 who had grown out of Scouts but wanted to be remain connected.

During the First World War, more than 50,000 Scouts participated in some form of war work on the home front. Scout buglers sounded the "all clear" after air raids or air strike, others helped in hospitals and made up aid parcels; Sea Scouts assisted the Coastguard in watching the vulnerable East coast.

In 1920, the association organised the first World Jamboree, held in Olympia, London, together with an international conference for leaders which led to the formation, in 1922, of the International Conference of the Boy Scout Movement now called the World Organization of the Scout Movement, of which the association was a founding member.

The Boy Scouts Headquarters Gazette was first published in July 1909, as the official publication for adult Scouters and administrators, alongside The Scout, a magazine for youth members which had been launched in April 1908.

1920 to 1967

In 1929, the association hosted the 3rd World Scout Jamboree at Arrowe Park in Cheshire; some 56,000 Scouts from 35 countries attended, making it the largest World Scout Jamboree to date. The first Gang Show, produced by Ralph Reader, opened at the Scala Theatre in London in October 1932. Following the outbreak of World War II, over 50,000 Scouts trained under the National War Service scheme. Tasks undertaken included police messengers and stretcher bearers. The Air Scout branch was launched in January 1941, allowing Scout Troops to specialise in activities related to aircraft and flying.

Baden-Powell, as the association's Chief Scout and chairman, continued to head and guide the association, going on world tours throughout the rest of his life until ill health caused him to retire to Kenya in 1938 where he died on 8 January 1941. He was succeeded as the association's Chief Scout by Lord Somers.

Starting in 1944, the Scout International Relief Service (SIRS) sent teams of Rovers and Scouters to continental Europe to provide humanitarian aid; ten SIRS teams worked at the recently relieved Bergen-Belsen concentration camp. After years of trial schemes, in 1946, the association launched its Senior Scout program for Boy Scouts aged fifteen to eighteen years to form separate patrols or troops, with age appropriate activities and badges. Scouts were prominent in their support of the 1948 Summer Olympics, playing leading roles in the open and closing ceremonies at Wembley Stadium and the sailing events at Torbay. The first Bob a Job Week took place in April 1949, in which Scouts did small tasks for the public in return for a "bob" (5 new pence) to raise funds for the association and for C. Arthur Pearson's fund for the blind. Over the association's history, some boys had been challenged to justify their membership because of their own or even their parents' religious or political beliefs. In the early 1950s, some Boy Scouts were dismissed or marginalized in their Scout Groups due to their involvement with the Young Communist League or related communist activities – the most high-profile case being that of Paul Garland from Bristol in 1954 which resulted in media reports and a debate in the House of Lords, where the association's Chief Scout, Lord Rowallan, defended the association's political and religious discrimination based on foreign communist regimes' antipathy to Scout organisations and the association's policy and Scout Promise requiring adherence to an organised religion and not accepting atheists. The matter was withdrawn without a division and it took 60 more years for the association to change its discriminatory policy and accept atheists. In 1957, to commemorate fifty years of Scouting and the centenary of Baden-Powell's birth, the association hosted the 9th World Scout Jamboree at Sutton Park in Birmingham.

1967 to 2001

The association's programmes went largely unchanged until it underwent a major review in the 1960s. The Chief Scouts' Advance Party was formed in 1964 and was sent to survey the association to see why membership numbers were falling. Their report was published in 1966 and changes were implemented later that year and throughout 1967. As a result, the word "boy" was dropped from the association's name which was changed to The Scout Association and major changes were made to the sections and their respective programmes. The youngest section were now named Cub Scouts, the Boy Scout section was renamed simply as the Scout section and the Senior Scouts and Rover Scout section was replaced with Venture Scouts for 16- to 20-year-olds. The uniform were also changed with the inclusion of optional long trousers for the Scouts, as opposed to the compulsory wearing of knee-length shorts, and the wearing of a Beret instead of the Campaign hat.

The Advance Party Report was not welcomed by all members and a rival report, A Boy Scout Black Paper, was produced in 1970 by The Scout Action Group. This provided alternative proposals for the development of the association and asked for groups that wished to continue to follow Baden-Powell's original scheme to be permitted to do so. The rejection of these proposals resulted in the formation of the Baden-Powell Scouts' Association.

Several developments were made over the following years, including the admission of girls, initially restricted to the Venture Scouts section in 1976, but from 1991 thanks to a young girl named Elizabeth Hainsworth, junior sections were allowed to become mixed as well, starting in Bradford, West Yorkshire and working its way throughout the U.K. Parents of children involved with the association in Northern Ireland also began to organise activities for children who were too young for Cubs. Initially, only the leaders of these activities, nicknamed Beavers, were members of the association, with the children participating not being enrolled by the association until it formally adopted the programme in 1986. In the late 1990s, a Muslim Scout Fellowship was formed, which by the end of 2007, had assisted the establishment of 13 Muslim Scout Groups in England and Wales.

Despite these and other changes, the association's enrolments fell into a decline through the 1990s with falling membership levels. This spurred a major review into the causes of the decline in 1999.

2001 to 2014

The association found itself competing for young people's time against many other extracurricular activities and schools themselves which were increasingly venturing into the same types of activities. In addition, adult leaders became concerned with the growing litigation culture in the UK and the negative stereotype as being old fashioned.

To keep up with trends and appeal to audience new generation, a new uniform, designed by Meg Andrew, was launched in 2001. The uniform included a variety of bold colours, with the younger sections wearing sweatshirts and activity trousers.

In 2002 the association launched its new vision towards 2012, which heralded another period of change. Venture Scouts programme was discontinued and two new sections were introduced: Scout Network for 18- to 25-year-olds, as well as Explorer Scouts for 14- to 18-year-olds. A new programme was introduced, complete with a new range of badges and awards covering a wider variety of topics such as Public Relations and Information Technology, developing practical and employability skills. The new badges drew mixed reactions from several public figures, with some praising the association for "moving with the times" and others feeling the changes went "against the Scouting ethos of Baden-Powell".

Further changes took place in 2003 when the association's Adult Training Scheme was relaunched to be more focused and targeted to the volunteers individual role as opposed to the more general training received before.

The association also began to change in its focus, with a renewed emphasis on outdoor adventure and it now offers over 200 fun and adventurous activities from abseiling and archery while also offering a wider range of development opportunities, from coding to music and drama. In 2004 the association appointed television presenter Peter Duncan as its Chief Scout, who was succeeded by adventurer Bear Grylls in July 2009. The first UK Chief Commissioner, Wayne Bulpitt was appointed on the same day, with a particular remit to support volunteers, grow and develop the association.

The association hosted several major events during this time including EuroJam in 2005, hosting 10,000 Scouts and Guides from 40 countries, the 21st World Scout Jamboree in 2007 as well as playing a major role in the centenary celebrations of Scouting that same year, with celebration events organised on Brownsea Island.

By 2010, census figures showed a strong upturn, with the association in April 2010 claiming its highest rate of growth in UK since 1972, with total claimed participation reaching just under half a million. In 2014, the association claimed an increase in youth membership of 100,000 in the ten years since 2004. In 2016 it claimed eleven years of consecutive growth and an increase in female membership, with 25% of participants now female in the 25 years since girls were first welcomed in 1976.

The association claims one of its biggest challenges is encouraging more adults to volunteer to reduce the number of young people on waiting lists (cited at around 40,000). However, by its reported figures (above) it has a high ratio of more than 1 adult volunteer to 4 participant young people (see above), and "young people" includes adults aged 18 to 25. The effort to attract new volunteers received a boost when the Duchess of Cambridge announced her intention to become a volunteer leader for the association with a Scout Group near her Anglesey home. In the decade up to 2014, the number of adult volunteers increased by 14,596 to a total of over 104,000.

2014 to present

A new Strategic Plan entitled Scouting for All was launched in 2014 to outline the association's focus to 2018. It proposed four key areas of activity: growth, inclusivity, youth-shaped Scouting and community impact. As part of this, in 2014, the association introduced the role of its national youth commissioner. The association's national youth commissioner works with its national leadership team; its chief executive, its Chief Scout, its chief commissioner and its chair of the board of trustees, to contribute to discussions on behalf of youth members and ensuring key changes are subject to youth consultation. Counties and district units were encouraged to appoint their own youth commissioners for young people to have an opportunity to influence their activities.

In October 2015, as part of the commitment to developing community impact, the association launched a three-year community impact project called "A Million Hands" to mobilise half a million Scouts to support four social issues chosen by their young people. Its aim is to build real and lasting relationships in communities that will enable young people to continue taking "social action" long into the future. The project works in partnership with six key charities; Mind, Alzheimer's Society, Leonard Cheshire Disability, Guide Dogs, Water Aid and Canal & River Trust to support the four key issues of dementia, disability, mental wellbeing and resilience and clean water and sanitation.

Also in 2015, Dr Ann Limb was appointed chair of the association, the first woman to hold the post. Already Commander of the Order of the British Empire (CBE), Limb was appointed Dame Commander of the Order of the British Empire (DBE) in the 2022 Birthday Honours for services to young people and philanthropy.

In September 2016, Tim Kidd replaced Wayne Bulpitt as the association's chief commissioner. Kidd has been involved with the association his whole life, starting as a Cub and then as a volunteer, in various leadership roles including Scout leader, district commissioner and county commissioner. In the 2016 Birthday Honours, Kidd received an OBE for services to young people.
Kidd's term will end in September 2021, with applications open for a replacement in September 2020.

Throughout 2016, the association celebrated the centenary of its Cub section, named Cubs100. Although Cubs began on an experimental basis in 1914, the centenary celebrations marked the launch of the fully developed Wolf Cub programme on 16 December 2016, a date which is regarded as the "official birthday of Cubs". Adventurer Steve Backshall was appointed Cubs100 Ambassador to raise the profile of the anniversary year. A range of events took place throughout 2016, from adventure camps to locally organised "promise parties" on 16 December itself, at which Cubs renewed their promises. One promise [arty in Kings Lynn was attended by the Duchess of Cambridge.

In May 2018, the association announced a new 'Skills For Life' strategy as its focus to 2023. Its objectives are similar (with the same outcomes of growth, inclusivity, youth shaped Scouting and community impact), however there is now more of a framework to develop and achieve the objectives. Alongside the new strategy launch, the association launched new branding to support the strategy and change the then 17-year-old logo. The major changes included a new typeface for documents and literature from the association, new colours with an updated corporate logo. This was introduced to the association on a two-year transition period.

As a consequence of the COVID-19 pandemic, in March 2020, the association's face-to-face activities were suspended and weekly meetings had to be delivered through Zoom. To support this, the association launched an online package of activities called "the Great Indoors" and a national fund raising campaign called "Hike to the Moon" in aid of those affected by the crisis, as well as online briefings for adult leaders. Despite these initiatives, in May 2021 it was announced that membership numbers had fallen by over 100,000 (from 480,083 to 362,752), with the number of adult leaders falling from 156,000 in 2020 to just under 141,000. This was reported to be the largest drop in numbers since 1941. It prompted the association to launch the Good For You campaign which had an aim of recruiting 10,000 leaders as the association had noticed young people were returning to the association quickly but without sufficient adults to build capacity.

Announced as part of the Skills For Life strategic plan in May 2018, from 2019 the association trialled an early years programme section. The name initially chosen for the pilots, involving children aged 4–6 years, was Hedgehogs and involved a programme funded by the Department for Education and delivered either as an association-led programme, a parent-led programme or a partner-led early years programme. The aim of the pilot was to explore early years provision with children of this age and determine whether this is a route the association should take. The association decided to proceed with the pilot and the phased roll out of the section over a period of years until it was in a position to introduce the section formally, now under the name Squirrels, in September 2021. The name was chosen after field testing in communities underrepresented in the association's programs, and because of the support of the Northern Ireland Squirrel Association that subsequently merged into the association after 25 years of independent operation alongside the association in Northern Ireland. The name is also recognised by many due its links to the popular children's programme Hey Duggee. Squirrels wear a red sweatshirt uniform and meet in Dreys organised within Scout groups. The initial 200 dreys were targeted to areas previously under-served by the association including diverse areas and those comprising a high number of low income households.

Organisational structure
The association is governed by a council of between 300 and 500 members in accordance with its various Royal Charters. The council consists of various officers and national commissioners of the association, some members nominated by the Scout Counties including young people aged between 18 and 25 and a majority of members elected by the council itself. The council elects the association's Chief Scout. Bear Grylls has been the association's Chief Scout since July 2009. The council also elects the association's Board of Trustees (formerly called the Committee of the council), which manages the business of the association and makes the policy and rules. A UK Chief Commissioner acts as the association's Deputy Chief Scout and appoints a team of chief commissioners and UK Commissioners who are responsible for programmes in their respective fields. The board of trustees maintain a professional headquarters staff who implement the policy of the association and provide support and services for the "proper conduct and development of Scouting". The Chief Executive is appointed by the Board to manage the work of the Headquarters staff.

In 2014, the association created the role of Youth Commissioner and Deputy Youth Commissioner. The Youth Commissioner works with the national leadership team, to advocate on behalf of youth members. Hannah Kentish was appointed as UK Youth Commissioner. In September 2018, Ollie Wood was appointed as the second UK Youth Commissioner for The Scouts at the end of Hannah's term. Alex Harvey and Victoria Lawton were appointed as deputies.

The association is divided into four mainland national groupings: England, Scotland, Wales, and Northern Ireland. While The association in England is directly managed by the UK Headquarters, each of the other nations has its own Scout Council and administration. Each of national divisions is further broken up into local Counties for England and Northern Ireland, Areas for Wales, Regions for Scotland and a Balliwick in the case of Guernsey, which generally follow the boundaries of the ceremonial counties of Great Britain. The County/Area/Region can then, in most cases, be broken down further into a number of Scout Districts which usually cover a town, some or all of a city or a section of a larger region such as the New Forest. These districts are themselves made up of several Scout Groups.

Scout Groups are the local organisations registered with The Scout Association, and are the direct descendants of the original Scout Patrols and Scout Troops. Groups can consist of one or more Beaver Colonies, Cub Packs, and Scout Troops and may also have one or more Scout Active Support Units, or an Explorer Scout Unit attached to it. Scout Groups only manage the first three sections, with Explorer Scouts and Scout Networks managed by the Scout District. Scout Groups are led by a Group Scout Leader whose main role is handling communication between the local District and the Section Leaders and ensuring the Scout Group meets the minimum standard required by the association.

At all levels, Scouts are governed by an executive of trustees, known as executive committees – these could be volunteers from the local community who have had ties with the association, either themselves or through their children. An executive normally consists of a chairman, secretary, treasurer, and a number of other officers. In Group Executive Committees, Group Scout Leaders and Section Leaders also form part of the committee. Their role is to ensure that the best interests of the young people and the community are served by the group, district, county, or national levels of the association.

All leaders work as unpaid volunteers, of which there are around 120,000. In addition to this number, the association employs 198 full-time and part-time staff to support the work of its adult volunteers. Senior volunteers in The Scout Association are called 'Commissioners'. Every County/Area/Region and District is headed by a Commissioner who is responsible for ensuring the Districts/Groups under their jurisdiction meet the standards set by the association. They receive support from Growth and Development Officer in England, who are employed by the Regional Services Team and deployed locally to help support the association's objectives. Commissioners in the other nations receive support from Field Commissioners, employed and directed differently. District Commissioners report to the County/Area/Regional Commissioner, who in turn report to the UK Chief Commissioner.

Sections

Core sections
The association has six age programmes to cater for youth aged between 4 and 25 years of age:

The core five sections (Squirrels to Explorers) are each led by a Section Leader and aided by Assistant Leaders, Sectional Assistants, parent helpers and Young Leaders, who are Explorer Scouts trained in leadership techniques. Scout Networks are mainly member led, but are assisted by a Network Commissioner who ensures that the Network is working within the rules of the association. In addition to adult leadership, the association encourages its members themselves to take on positions of responsibility for their section meetings. This can be through responsibility for a group of members, such as the Patrol Leader and Assistant Patrol Leader in Scouts and Sixers and Seconders in Cubs, or through sectional forums to feedback on programmes. The Scout section also have the role of Senior Patrol Leader, usually someone about to move on to Explorers who overlooks all the patrols, and the members of the Explorer section are openly encouraged to run evenings and to plan their own meetings.

Air and Sea Scouts
Some Scout Groups offer special Scouting programmes called Air Scouts and Sea Scouts. Both programmes follow the same core programme in all sections but can add more aeronautical or nautical emphasis, with some Scout Troops or Explorer Scout Units choosing to seek to be recognised by the Royal Air Force or Royal Navy. In the United Kingdom there are approximately 400 Sea Scout Groups, of which about 25% (101 Groups) are Royal Navy recognised, whilst of 117 Air Scout Groups, 43 are recognised by the RAF. The number of Troops or Units that can be recognised in either scheme is strictly limited and recognition is only awarded to those which meet the requirements and pass an inspection by a service officer. Recognised Troops or Units are inspected biennially and only retain their recognised status if they have continued to meet the required standards.

Adult roles and appointments

The association's Patron was the late Queen Elizabeth II. The association's current joint presidents are the Duke of Kent and Catherine, Duchess of Cambridge.

Below these are the members of the association's Headquarters, including the association's Chief Scout, who is honorary head of the association and its public face, and its chief commissioner, who is in charge of the volunteers in the association and of the other commissioners. Below these are the commissioners for the nations, regions, counties, areas and districts, all of whom are assisted by deputies and assistant commissioners who can oversee and advise on a particular area of responsibility – for example an assistant district commissioner for Beaver Scouts particularly ensures that that section in the district is abiding to the association's rules. The final managerial role in the association is that of the Group Scout Leader and their assistant, who are both in charge of a local Scout group. All of these roles are uniformed and for those volunteer roles from County level downwards training is required in the basic values of the association, safety and child protection, inclusion and advanced managerial skills to achieve their Wood Badge.

At the local sectional level, a section is run by a Scout Leader, who is in overall charge of the section, and by Assistant Scout Leaders, who assist the Leader in their role. These roles are uniformed and also require training to achieve their Wood Badge, although their training content consists of the basic values of the association, inclusion, camping and Scout skills and administration. They are also required to complete First Aid, safety and child protection training every three years.

Below leaders are the uniformed role of Sectional Assistant and the non-uniformed role of Occasional Helper. The Sectional Assistant has to complete basic training consisting of the values of the association, safety and child protection only while an occasional helper is a non-uniformed role and requires only to have a criminal records check by the Disclosure and Barring Service. In addition, there are Young Leaders who must complete training in child protection and safety and then have the option to complete further modules on topics that mirror the adult training programme.

Adults can also become members of Scout Active Support Units that provide a variety of services to the association at group, district, county/area or national level. These units allow adults to support Association activities without having the full-time commitment of a leadership role.

Programme, badges and awards

Programme history
The youth programme has been developed from Baden-Powell's original Scout training scheme, which aimed to encourage personal achievement and provide a framework for the activities of the Scout Troop. In the Boy Scout section, this consisted of the award of badges for Tenderfoot, Second and First Class Scout and finally King's Scout, which were earned by passing tests in a wide variety of skills associated with the outdoors, health and good citizenship. With the creation of the Wolf Cub section in 1916, a similar system was devised, the awards being Tenderpad, First Star and Second Star, and an award called the Leaping Wolf was added later which required Cubs to move up to the Scout Troop. In parallel with this scheme, Cubs and Scouts were able to earn Proficiency Badges for specific skills and hobbies, an idea that Baden-Powell probably copied from Ernest Thompson Seton. The test requirements for Baden-Powell's scheme were revised in 1944 and again in 1958 without altering the basic structure.

The 1966 Advance Party Report recommended a wholly new Progressive Training Scheme; for Cub Scouts the Bronze, Silver and Gold Arrows, for Scouts the Scout Standard, Advanced Scout Standard and Chief Scout's Award and for the new Venture Scout Section, the Venture Award and the Queen's Scout Award which focused on long-term service and commitment as well as the completion of an expedition lasting four days and fifty miles. These changes were implemented in October 1967. From then on, the programme has been subject to regular revision; the Scout standards were replaced in 1984 by the Scout Award, Pathfinder Award and Explorer Award with a fully revised Chief Scout's Award. The Cub arrows were replaced in 1991 with the Cub Scout Award, Adventure Award and Adventure Crest Award. All these awards were replaced following the introduction of the Programme Review in February 2002. A new concept called the Balanced Programme replaced the previous scheme. Challenge Awards could be earned by participating in activities in various Programme Zones such as outdoors, fitness, community or international. Earning a certain number of Challenge Awards and the completion of a personal challenge led to the Bronze Chief Scout's Award for Beavers, Silver for Cubs and Gold for Scouts. Proficiency Badges were revised and renamed Activity Badges. In 2015, the programme was revised again following consultation within the association, the changes being called the Programme Refresh.

Award scheme
The previous Programme Zones have been replaced by three themes, being "outdoor and adventure", "world" and "skills". It is recommended for all sections that about 50% of the programme be devoted to outdoor and adventure skills and activities. The structure of Challenge Badges and Chief Scout's Awards has been retained but the content has been revised and made "more challenging". Beavers have to earn six Challenge Badges to Gain the Bronze Chief Scout's Award, Cubs seven for the Silver and Scouts nine for the Gold. The final three awards, The Chief Scout's Platinum and Diamond Awards and the King's Scout Award are available in the Explorer Scout and Scout Network sections. The awards build on the requirements of The Duke of Edinburgh's Award at Bronze, Silver and Gold level respectively, consisting of a period of time volunteering in the local community, a prolonged physical activity, the advancement of a skill and the undertaking an expedition, allowing a participant to achieve both the DofE and the Scout award at the same time. In addition, these three awards do not have to be completed in order, and participants can skip straight to a specific award, although additional work is involved. Achieving the King's Scout Award is seen as a significant event on a national scale; recipients of the award are invited to join the St George's Day service at Windsor Castle the year after completing the scheme, and parade before King Charles III or his representative.

Awards for gallantry, meritorious conduct and good service
The Cornwell Scout Badge may be awarded to youth members who display "pre-eminently high character and devotion to duty, together with great courage and endurance". Any member of the association may be awarded the Gilt Cross or the Silver Cross for gallantry, or the Bronze Cross for "special heroism or action in the face of extraordinary risk". The Chief Scout's Commendation for Meritorious Conduct and the Medal of Meritorious Conduct may also be awarded to any member.  Adult members are awarded the Chief Scout's Length of Service Award which marks the number of years of service in any role. More distinguished good service by adult members may be marked by the award of the Chief Scout's Commendation for Good Service, the Award of Merit, the Silver Acorn or ultimately, the Silver Wolf, which is the unrestricted gift of the Chief Scout and is awarded for service of "a most exceptional nature".

Promise and law

Variation of a Scout Promise are made by all participants of the association from the Scout section upwards, including Leaders with variations for different faiths or for members from other countries, whose allegiance is pledged to the country and not the monarch:

:On my honour, I promise that I will do my best,
To do my duty to God and to the King,
To help other people,
And to keep the Scout Law.

For Beavers and Cubs, a simpler promise is used: Cub Scouts utilise the normal promise with the omission of the opening 'On my honour' and a change in the final line "to keep the Cub Scout Law", while Beaver Scouts use a different promise altogether:

:I promise to do my best,
To be kind and helpful,
And to love God.

In addition to the promise, there is a Scout Law which dictates what qualities a Scout should hold. The Scout Law is as follows:

A Scout is to be trusted.
A Scout is loyal.
A Scout is friendly and considerate.
A Scout belongs to the world-wide family of Scouts.
A Scout has courage in all difficulties.
A Scout makes good use of time and is careful of possessions and property.
A Scout has self-respect and respect for others.

This law is used for all sections except Cubs and Beavers. Beaver Scouts have no law, as these values are to be demonstrated through the meetings themselves. The Cub Scout law is different again:

:Cub Scouts always do their best,
think of others before themselves
and do a good turn every day.

The motto of the association, as with many other Scouting organisations, is 'Be Prepared'.

Variations of the promise
There are permitted variations to the original Scout Promise to accommodate those whose faith or national allegiance are different. The association expects that the phrases "...duty to God" and "...to love God" will be suitable for most faiths "including Christians, Hindus, Jews, Muslims and Sikhs". Muslims who have difficulty with the phrase "On my honour" because of the Islamic proscription of swearing oaths, are able to say "In the name of Allah, the Most Beneficent the Most Merciful…" instead if they prefer. Also, "...duty to Allah and to the King" may be used. Hindus and Buddhists may promise "...duty to my Dharma".

Foreign nationals resident in the United Kingdom are able to promise to do their "...duty to God and to the country in which I am now living", although British subjects must include the King in their promise.

In 2012 the association reviewed its fundamentals and launched a consultation to ask its members whether an alternative version of the Scout Promise should be developed for atheists and those unable to make the existing commitment. In 2013 it was announced that the consultation had led to the addition of an alternative promise for humanists and atheists. Taking effect on 1 January 2014, members can choose to replace "duty to God" with "to uphold our Scout values". The change has been welcomed by representatives of the Church of England, the Roman Catholic Church, the Free Churches Group and the British Humanist Association. The alternative promise takes the following form:

:On my honour, I promise that I will do my best,
To uphold our Scout values, to do my duty to the King,
To help other people,
And to keep the Scout Law.

Uniform

History of uniform
In Scouting for Boys, Baden-Powell recommended a distinctive and practical uniform that was "very like the uniform worn by my men when I commanded the South African Constabulary". This in turn, seems to have been derived from the dress adopted by Baden-Powell in the Second Matabele War of 1896, influenced by his friend and colleague, Frederick Russell Burnham. The original Boy Scout uniform consisted of a khaki shirt and shorts, a neckerchief or "scarf", campaign hat and a Scout staff. At the formation of the Wolf Cub section in 1916, Baden-Powell wanted to make the younger boys totally distinct from the older Boy Scouts; the result was a green woollen jersey, shorts, neckerchief and a green cricket cap with gold piping. In 1946, the new Senior Scout section were allowed to wear a maroon beret instead of the hat; a green beret became an option for the Boy Scout section in 1954.

In 1966, the Advance Party Report recommended a total redesign and modernisation of the uniform, commenting that there had been much criticism of "the Boer War appearance of our uniforms" and that the "wearing of shorts by members of the Movement is one of the most damaging aspects of our present public image". Although the Cub uniform barely changed, retaining short trousers, the Scout section were to wear a long sleeved dark green shirt and long trousers in a brownish colour described as "mushroom". Venture Scouts and male Scouters had identical khaki shirts and mushroom trousers, but the neckerchief was replaced by a tie, brown for Venture Scouts and green for Scouters. Female Scouters had a dark green dress and a cap similar to those worn by airline flight attendants at the time. These recommendations were accepted and implemented from October 1967.

Later amendments included khaki shirts for female Venture Scouts and Scouters, the abolition of all uniform headgear except Sea Scout caps and Air Scout berets, and black long trousers for Cubs as an option to shorts. A grey sweatshirt was introduced for the new Beaver Scout section in 1986 and a dark green sweatshirt replaced the Cubs' knitted jersey. The Scout uniforms of this era would feature on the Scout Association's Coat of Arms, which features two bearers wearing uniforms of the pre-Advance Party Report and some that were current at the time of the award in 1969. Certificates with the design would remain in use until May 2021.

In 2001, following a consultation process within the association, a new range of uniforms designed by Meg Andrews was launched on Founder's Day, 22 February.

Uniforms

Squirrel Scouts
Squirrel Scout uniform is a red sweatshirt, a neckerchief and a woggle.

Beaver Scouts
Beaver Scout uniform consists of a turquoise sweatshirt, a neckerchief and woggle. Uniform options decided on at the group level include navy blue shorts, a grey fleece jacket and a navy blue baseball cap. A navy blue skirt may be worn as a personal choice. Navy blue combat trousers (known officially as "activity trousers") and a turquoise polo shirt may be worn as activity dress.

Cub Scouts
Cub Scout uniform consists of a dark green sweatshirt, a neckerchief and a woggle identifying the cub's six (sub division of  a pack). Uniform options decided on at the group level include navy blue shorts, a grey fleece jacket, a navy blue jacket and a navy blue baseball cap. A navy blue skirt may be worn as a personal choice.  Navy blue combat trousers and a dark green polo shirt may be worn as activity dress.

Scouts
Scout uniform consists of a teal green long sleeved shirt or blouse, navy blue combat trousers (or navy blue skirt), group neckerchief, woggle and a Scout belt. Uniform options decided on at the group level include navy blue shorts, a grey fleece jacket, a navy blue jacket and a navy blue baseball cap.  Navy blue combat trousers and a teal green polo shirt may be worn as activity dress.

Sea Scout uniform is the same as the main Scout uniform except a dark blue jersey and/or a light blue shirt or blouse are worn. Sea Scouts wear a round seaman's cap with "Sea Scout" a "Sea Scout" tally band. An additional group option is for a lanyard with a bosun's call.

Air Scout uniform is the same as the main Scout uniform except that the shirt/blouse is light blue and a blue-grey beret is worn.

Explorer Scouts
As for Scouts, but with a beige shirt or blouse and the explorer Scout belt may be worn. The optional activity uniform polo shirt is beige.

Explorer Sea Scouts  wear similar uniforms except that a light blue shirt or blouse, smart navy blue trousers and a round seamans cap with "Explorer Sea Scout" tallyband or a white-topped officer's peaked cap (depending on group). The lanyard and bosun's call is an option decided at group level. Explorer Air Scouts wear the light blue shirt or blouse, smart navy blue trousers and a blue-grey beret. Explorer Sea Scouts and Air Scouts may wear a blue tie instead of the neckerchief, an additional activity uniform top option for both units is a navy blue sweatshirt.

Adult members (including Network)
As for Explorer Scouts, but with a shirt of a light khaki colour, described as "stone" which may be short sleeved. A tie may be worn by all adult members and smart trousers may be worn instead of combat trousers. The activity uniform top is a navy blue polo shirt, an optional navy blue sweatshirt or stone-coloured polo shirt may be worn instead.

Adult members in Sea Scout units wear uniforms similar to Sea Scout explorers except that the only headgear is the officers hat and an option of a tricorne hat for women. Adult members in Air Scout groups wear uniform identical to air Scout explorers.

Kilts 

All members in Scotland or those entitled to do so by descent may wear a tartan kilt or skirt. This can be either their own tartan or the Scout tartan pattern; to be worn with a plain leather sporran, green knee-length socks and gartar tabs and black shoes. Members in Northern Ireland or those entitled to do so by descent may wear a saffron kilt or skirt. This should be worn with a plain leather sporran; traditional coloured plain socks; black or brown shoes (all members in a section should wear the same coloured socks and shoes). A tailored outer jacket may be worn with either kilt.

Finances
The association is a registered charity. The association's finances are collected through a variety of ways. Members pay for association programmes through an annual capitation or membership fee, and subscriptions to the local group, paid termly, monthly or weekly depending on local preference. The membership fee pays for member insurance and for the services and leader support provided by their district, country (or equivalent) and headquarters. The national membership fee for 2021–22, for all members under 18, is £36.50 (or £36.00 for prompt payment by 23 April 2021), an increase of £7.50 compared to the 2020-21 fee. Of this, £1.50 is a reserved contribution ring-fenced to support any Groups who cannot access funding. Subs are used to pay for the day-to-day running of activities, pay for materials and to finance the section's meeting place.

To lessen the burden on members, many Groups undertake local fundraising and utilise additional methods of funding, such as Gift Aid. In addition, headquarters operates several other ventures open to those outside of the association, the profits of which are returned to the association.

Scout Community Week
Scout Community Week is a campaign of the association and its biggest national fundraising event. It is a revival and updated version of the earlier "Bob-a-Job" Week (started in 1949) and later "Scout Job Week" in which Scouts were paid small sums of money for completing usually domestic tasks for local residents. The modern Scout Community Week involves Scouts from all sections of the association taking part in community work in exchange for a donation to the group. Re-introduced in 2012, the event has attracted media attention.

Commercial ventures
The association operates several ventures that offer an enhancement to its programmes but also services consumers outside its programmes. The profits are returned to the Scout Association to subsidise the running of the Scout programme and to reduce the burden of financing on the members themselves.

The Scout Adventures brand is run directly from within the Scout Association and is responsible for running a network of national activity centres open to members of Scouts and from organisations outside of Scouts including schools and other youth groups. Its turnover and profits form part of the charitable activities of the association and contributed £4.9 million in the year up to 31 March 2020.

In addition, the Scout Association owns 100% of the following subsidiary companies which provide trading income to the association:
 Scout Shops Ltd trading as Scout Store sells Scout Association uniforms, equipment and gifts online and on the high street by supplying local Scout shops run mostly by Scout Districts. In the year up to 31 March 2020, it had a turnover of £9.4 million with their taxable profits of £3 million returned to the association.
 World Scout Shop Ltd sells similar merchandise and gifts to the Scout Store but to a global market along with exclusive world Scout items. It was created in 2011 at the 22nd World Scout Jamboree in Sweden and uses the same infrastructure as the Scout Store. In the year up to 31 March 2020, it had a turnover of £500,000 with their taxable profits of £30,000 returned to the association.
 Scout Insurance Services Ltd trading as Unity Insurance Services is an insurance broker providing insurance solutions tailored to the movement and other charities and similar non-profit organisations including Girlguiding. In the year up to 31 March 2020, it had a turnover of £2.4 million and a pre-tax profit of £1.2 million.
 Scout Insurance (Guernsey) Ltd. acts as the insurance underwriters for the association and Unity and paid its net profit pre-tax of £200,000 as a dividend to the association.
 Scout Services Ltd. manages the association's property, runs the conference centres located at Gilwell Park and 65 Queen's Gate and manages sponsorship and marketing for the association such as selling advertising space in member focused Scouting Magazine. In the year up to 31 March 2020, it had a turnover of £3.8 million and a pre-tax profit of £700,000. This subsidiary has been hit hard by the COVID-19 pandemic as the association announced the cessation of the printed Scouting Magazine, the closure of the Gilwell Park conference centre and the selling of the 65 Queen's Gate site.

Former commercial ventures include the Scout Holiday Homes Trust which operated ten properties across the UK catering for those with low incomes or disabilities between 1969 and 2011 when the assets were transferred to the independent Holiday Homes Trust which maintains some links with the Scouts.

Campsites

Across the country, over 900 campsites are owned by the association; usually they are owned and operated by a Scout District or County. These campsites are also used by others outside the association to gain additional income for the Scout county or district.

Twelve sites are branded and operated as Scout Adventure Centres, providing camping sites and affordable adventurous activities. These are Gilwell Park on the London/Essex border, Buddens in Dorset, Crawfordsburn in County Down, Downe in Kent, Fordell Firs in Fife, Great Tower in the Lake District, Hawkhirst in Northumberland, Lochgoilhead on Loch Lomond, Meggernie in Perthshire, Woodhouse Park in Gloucestershire, Youlbury in Oxfordshire and Yr Hafod in Snowdonia.

In addition to these sites, the association runs two conference centres, one within Gilwell Park, and another at a separate site in central London, Baden-Powell House. Baden-Powell House is an Association hostel, providing cheap accommodation for central London trips.

Relations with other organisations

Girlguiding UK
The Scout Association and Girlguiding UK are separate organisations, but were both founded by Robert Baden-Powell and share similar aims and methods. Co-operation between the association and GirlGuiding UK is encouraged at all levels. ’Joint Groups’ of Scout and Guide units meeting separately in the same headquarters and operating under the same support structure are recognized and encouraged by both associations. It is also possible to have a ’Joint Unit’, which may consist of Rainbow Guides and Beaver Scouts, or Brownie Guides and Cub Scouts, or Guides and Scouts. They meet together as a single unit, sharing leadership and facilities but individual members wear the uniform and follow the training programme of the association that they belong to. Members of Girlguiding UK are invited to join the United Kingdom Scout Contingent to participate in the World Scout Jamborees every four years.

The Scout Association in Ireland

The Scout Association of Northern Ireland co-exists in the province with Scouting Ireland which is the World Organization of the Scout Movement recognized association for the Republic of Ireland. The two associations have been increasingly working in partnership; they jointly run a project called "Scoutlink" which delivers citizenship and peace building programmes with a range of groups in Northern Ireland and the border counties of the Republic.

The Duke of Edinburgh's Award
The Scout Association is one of more than 2,600 "Licensed Organisations" that operate the Duke of Edinburgh Award Scheme. Scout participation in the scheme started in February 1959, having been unable to join the 1956 experimental launch due to the 1957 Golden Jubilee of Scouting events and the 1958 revision of the Scout badge programme.

Notable former Scouts

The association has had many notable past members, with the following selection being the best known:
 David Attenborough – broadcaster and naturalist
 David Beckham – England international footballer and former captain
 Tony Blair – former Prime Minister of the United Kingdom
 Chris Bonington – mountaineer
 David Bowie – singer-songwriter, producer and actor
 Richard Branson – Virgin Group Founder
 Ronnie Corbett – actor and comedian who worked with Ronnie Barker in the British television comedy series The Two Ronnies
 Bear Grylls – adventurer and television personality and the association's Chief Scout
 John Major – former Prime Minister of the United Kingdom
 Paul McCartney – singer/songwriter/bassist of the Beatles and Wings
 John Lennon – singer/songwriter of the Beatles attended the 3rd Allerton Scout Group in Liverpool.
 George Michael – singer/songwriter
 Cliff Richard – singer
 Keith Richards – guitarist and songwriter of the Rolling Stones
 Harold Wilson – former Prime Minister of the United Kingdom

Scout Association overseas

History
Following the origin of Scouting, Scout organisations formed in many parts of the British Empire. Some of these organisations later became branches of The Boy Scouts Association after its formation. In other cases, The Boy Scouts Association started branches itself in parts of British Empire. The Boy Scouts Association's "Headquarters" in London was renamed "Imperial Headquarters" (IHQ). The Boy Scouts International Bureau was formed in 1920 and became fully functional under the International Conference of the Boy Scout Movement in 1922. Subsequently, The Boy Scouts Association branches in the Dominions of Canada, Australia, New Zealand, Newfoundland, and South Africa were given the option of being "separately represented" with the Boy Scouts International Bureau, but chose instead to remain under IHQ control. Over time, many of the branches of The Scout Association became direct members of the World Organization of the Scout Movement; for instance, Scouts Canada in 1946 and The Scout Association of Hong Kong in 1977.

Overseas branches
The association has branches in the British overseas territories and Crown Dependencies, as well as some small independent nations.
Non-sovereign territories in which the association operates programmes include:

 Anguilla
 Bermuda
 Cayman Islands
 Falkland Islands (Groups are part of the British Scouting Overseas Area)
 Gibraltar

 Montserrat
 Saint Helena (Groups are part of the British Scouting Overseas Area)
 British Virgin Islands
 Turks and Caicos Islands
 Isle of Man

Sovereign countries in which the association operates programmes, as they are without independent Scouting organisations, include:
 Saint Kitts and Nevis
 Tonga
 Tuvalu
 Vanuatu

British Scouting Overseas 
The UK Scout programme is also offered to British citizens living outside of the United Kingdom via the British Scouting Overseas (BSO) Area. BSO has 4 Scout "Districts" in Southern Europe, Middle East, Northern Europe and Rest of the World, and a total of 55 Scout Groups, in 26 countries.

British Scouting Overseas was formed, on 1 April 2012, from an amalgamation of the British Groups Abroad and British Scouts in Western Europe Scout "Areas". At that point, there were 5 districts in France & Iberia, Middle East, Benelux & Scandinavia, Germany and Rest of the World. Since that point, Benelux & Scandinavia has merged with Germany, to create the Northern Europe district. In June 2021, France & Iberia District transitioned into Southern Europe after the addition of a group in Italy.

See also

 World Organization of the Scout Movement

References

Further reading

External links

 The Scout Association Homepage
  Official British Scouting Overseas Webpage

 
1908 establishments in the United Kingdom
Organisations based in Essex
World Organization of the Scout Movement member organizations
Youth organizations established in 1908